Children and Young Persons Act may refer to 

 Children and Young Persons Act 1933, an Act of the Parliament of the United Kingdom
 Child and Young Persons (Amendment) Act 1952, an Act of the Parliament of the United Kingdom
 Children and Young Persons (Harmful Publications) Act 1955, an Act of the Parliament of the United Kingdom
 Children and Young Persons Act 1956, an Act of the Parliament of the United Kingdom
 Children and Young Persons Act 1963, an Act of the Parliament of the United Kingdom
 Children and Young Persons (Care and Protection) Act 1998, New South Wales legislation
 Children and Young Persons Act 2008, an Act of the Parliament of the United Kingdom